The Leo Lalonde Memorial Trophy is awarded each year to the best overage player in the Ontario Hockey League, as selected by the teams' general managers. The trophy was donated by the trainers of the league in memory of Leo Lalonde, former chief scout of the Belleville Bulls and Peterborough Petes.

Winners
List of recipients of the Leo Lalonde Memorial Trophy.

See also
 List of Canadian Hockey League awards

References

External links
 Ontario Hockey League

Ontario Hockey League trophies and awards
Awards established in 1984